Oldbury Naite is a village in South Gloucestershire, England.

References 

Villages in South Gloucestershire District